Help! is a 1965 album by the George Martin Orchestra, the second in a series of albums by Martin featuring instrumental arrangements of Beatles songs. United Artists released the LP in the United States on 19 September 1965, and EMI's Columbia Graphophone label released it in the United Kingdom on 19 November. The album consists of Martin's interpretations of songs from the Beatles' own Help! album, which was issued in August 1965.

Track listing
The following list is for the Columbia version. The United Artists release lists "I've Just Seen a Face", "It's Only Love" and "Yesterday" under their working titles (*) and omits the track "Bahama Sound".

All song written by Lennon–McCartney, except where noted.

Side one
"Help!" – 2:37
"Another Girl" – 2:08
"You're Going to Lose That Girl" – 2:16
"I Need You" (George Harrison) – 2:50
"You've Got to Hide Your Love Away" – 1:58
"The Night Before" – 2:29

Side two
"Ticket to Ride" – 3:00
"Bahama Sound" (George Martin) – 2:40
"I've Just Seen a Face (Auntie Gin's Theme*)" – 2:10
"It's Only Love (That's a Nice Hat*)" – 2:37
"Tell Me What You See" – 2:41
"Yesterday (Scrambled Egg*)" – 2:19

Notes

References

Citations

Sources 

 

1965 albums
Albums produced by George Martin
George Martin albums
The Beatles tribute albums
Albums arranged by George Martin
Columbia Records albums
Instrumental albums
United Artists Records albums
Albums conducted by George Martin